Chakkiligintha is a 2014 Indian Telugu film starring Sumanth Ashwin and Chandini Sreedharan. It was directed by Vema Reddy, an erstwhile assistant and protégé of Sukumar.

Plot

Adi and Avantika or Avi study in the same college. Adi is a love guru and advises boys not to express their love for girlfriends until they reveal their true feelings. On the other side Avi learns that Adi is the person behind the sudden change in the boys and challenges that she will make Adi to fall in love with her. Did she succeed in her challenge, what did Adi do as his part is the crux of the 

Adi comes up with a new concept, why should girls have all the fun? He lectures his friends that instead of them running around the girls, it should be the other way round. He sells his theory. The girls, understandably, are taken aback with the boys ignoring them. They feel miserable. If Adi's got a concept that's changed the nature of the boys, Avi comes up with an idea to counter that concept. The girls pin their hopes on Avi, and eventually with her plans working out, the boys once again behave like boys, running after them and doing their bidding.

Adi and Avi throw a challenge at each other. Adi will behave like Avi is his girlfriend and Avi too will consider him as her boyfriend. Avi will try to make Adi express his love for her and Adi tells her he will never ever do that.

Smart as she proves to be, Avi is clearly winning at every stage. And one day, it happens in front of everyone. Adi declares his love for Avi. He accepts that his concept has failed and it is not right for boys to expect that it should be girls who should be the first ones to express their love. But Adi gets a shock. Avi tells him that she does not love him and her only purpose in moving around with him was to prove that his concept was wrong.

Avi goes back to her hometown Visakhapatnam but Adi follows her from Hyderabad. Avi's wedding is fixed with another boy as she consents to the proposal that her parents bring. What will Adi do?

Cast
Sumanth Ashwin as Adi
Chandini Sreedharan (credited as Rehhana) as Avantika "Avi"
Sudigali Sudheer as Bar Waiter
Madhunandan
Viva Harsha

Soundtrack

The Music was composed by Mickey J. Meyer and Released by Shreyas Music.

References

External links 
 

2010s Telugu-language films